Simone Menezes (born 22 January 1977) is an Italo-Brazilian conductor based in France.

Early life
Menezes was born in Brasília. She studied piano, flute and conducting at the State University of Campinas (Unicamp). This university ranks first in the list of best universities in Latin America according to the British magazine Times Higher Education.)

At the age of 20, she created her first orchestra, the young symphonic orchestra of Campinas – Unicamp. She obtained sponsorship from the Petrobras to develop the young orchestra, perform tours and record, subsequently going to Europe to study.

In 2007–2008, she obtained a scholarship to study at the École normale de musique de Paris where she was awarded her diploma after only one year of study. In parallel, she studied with Colin Metters in London and developed contemporary music repertoire while residing with the Remix Ensemble (Portugal) and Ensemble Multilatérale (Paris).

Career
On her return to Brazil, from 2008 until 2012 she assumed the direction of the Unicamp Symphony Orchestra and became, after Ligia Amadio, only the second woman to be a conductor of a professional orchestra in Brazil. While at the orchestra of UNICAMP, her project "Panorama da Musica Brasileira" received the prize awarded by the São Paulo State Association of Critics. She developed several multidisciplinary projects including dance, music, technology and premiered more than 20 works.

In 2013, she founded and directed the "Camerata Latino Americana", an ensemble specialized in the interpretation of Latin American repertoire and attracted the attention of the ISPA International Society for the Performing Arts of New York and the Association of British Orchestras in London.

In 2014, she founded with the pianist Sonia Rubinsky the "Villa Lobos Project", a project dedicated to promoting the work of the composer Villa-Lobos and classical Brazilian music internationally; the development of a reflection on Brazilian identity in partnership with other artists, researchers and the general public; the realization of artistic and cultural projects such as concerts, masterclasses and publications.

Since 2014, she has been mentored by Paavo Järvi and works as his assistant on several projects.

In 2019, she was awarded second prize in the European competition MAWOMA (Master Woman Orchestra) for female orchestra conductors at the Musikverein in Vienna. In the same year, she made her Japanese debut with the Osaka Symphony Orchestra and Chofu International Music Festival.

Considered to be an avant-gardist and an engaged personality, today there are around 4% women orchestra conductors in the world, Menezes was the second woman to be at the head of a professional orchestra in Brazil at a time when there were even less. She has always been engaged in numerous multidisciplinary projects and her style is considered as innovative. She has worked with composers such as: Thomas Ades, Esteban Benzecry, Lera Auerbach, Philippe Hersant. 

In 2019, she launched a new project called "K", an orchestral ensemble formed by musicians from several countries to explore unusual repertoires and multidisciplinary projects. The ensemble is based in Lille, Belgium and Paris.The Ensemble K released in 2020 his first album Accents by the label Aparté acclaimed by the press and said by the newspaper le monde "Founded in 2019 by the Italian-Brazilian conductor Simone Menezes, Ensemble K calls itself: Klassique, Kosmopolite, Kontemporain, Kréatif , Connected”. And that's true ! " And in 2022, she created with her orchestra K lhe  a multiforme musical project "Metanoia", the project launched by the german label Accentus, includes a CD, a touring and the documentary Metanoia that brings a fresh discussion about classical music, art and photography. The documentary is signed by the Grammy winner Paul Smaczny and features Italian thinker Alberto Cavali, German painter Michael Triegel and conductor Antonio Pappano.   

In 2021 Philharmonie de Paris comissionated a symphonic project around Amazon Rainforest that Simone developped in partenaire with the photographer Sebastiao Salgado, a concert combining the music of Villa-Lobos and Philip Glass with the images of the photographer. The project, acclaimed by "The Guardian", made its debut at the Philharmonie de Paris and went on tour in several cities around the world, passing by the Barbican in London, the Pacco da Musica in Rome among others.  

In the Universal Exposition of Dubai in 2022, she also leads the concert "The beauty will save the world" with Cartier Womens Initiative as part of the Women's Pavilion at the Universal exhibition in Dubai, bringing a first female conductor, ensemble and a female choir to this country.

Personal life

Menezes is married since the age of 20 to the engineer Humberto Menezes and is the mother of Julia Menezes.

Discography

 Novos Universos Sonoros with Orquestra Sinfônica da Unicamp (2009) 
 Suíte Contemporânea Brasileira with Camerata Latino Americana (2015) 
 Accents with  Ensemble K (Aparté; 2020)  
 Metanoia - Puccini, Bach, Villa-Lobos, Pärt, Borodin. With Manon Galy, Violine; Ensemble K (Accentus; 2021)

References

External links

Villa Lobos Project website
https://www.ensemblek.com/

1977 births
Living people
Musicians from Brasília
Brazilian conductors (music)
Women conductors (music)
20th-century women musicians
21st-century women musicians